Keith Sykes may refer to

 Keith Sykes (anaesthetist) (1925–2019), English physician
 Keith Sykes (musician) (born 1948), American singer-songwriter